The Kill the Lights Tour was the fourth headlining concert tour by American country music artist Luke Bryan. The tour is in support of his fifth studio album Kill the Lights (2015) and began on February 11, 2016, in Evansville, Indiana. The tour played before 1.6 million fans in 2016. The tour's second leg began on February 16, 2017, in Huntington, West Virginia and ended on March 18, 2017, in Orange Beach, Alabama.

Background
The tour was first announced on October 20, 2015 though Bryan's website. In November 2016, Bryan announced the tour would continue into 2017.

Opening acts
Little Big Town
Dustin Lynch
Brett Eldredge

Set list

"Rain Is a Good Thing"
"Kick the Dust Up
"Kiss Tomorrow Goodbye"
"Move"
"I See You"
"Crash My Party"
"Roller Coaster"
"Play It Again"
"Strip It Down"
"Home Alone Tonight" 
"Thinkin Out Loud" / "Lets Get It On" 
"Play Something Country 
"Huntin', Fishin' and Lovin' Every Day" 
"Drink a Beer"
"Drunk on You"
"All My Friends Say" / "Country Man"
"That's My Kind of Night"
Encore
"Country Girl (Shake It for Me)"
"I Don't Want This Night to End" / "Can't Feel My Face"

Tour dates

List of festivals
 This concert was part of the Summerfest at Marcus Amphitheater in Henry Maier Festival Park.

Personnel
Michael Carter – band leader, electric guitar
Jason Faussett – acoustic guitar, piano
James Cook – bass guitar 
Kent Slucher  – drums
Kevin Arrowsmith  – fiddle, electric guitar
Dave Ristrum – banjo

References

External links

2016 concert tours
2017 concert tours
Luke Bryan concert tours